Le Fleuve Niger se meurt is a 2006 documentary film.

Synopsis 
This short documentary film tells the story of Alfari, who lives on the bank of the Niger, a river which is slowly running dry due to climate change. Alfari had to give up fishing to become a gardener, fighting against the hippopotamus that devastate his plantations.

Awards 
 Nord Sud Ginebra 2006
 Angers 2007
 Quintessence de Ouidah 2008

References 

2006 films
Nigerien documentary films
2006 short documentary films
Niger River
Documentary films about water and the environment